The Project 25 Inter RF Subsystem Interface (P25 ISSI) is a non-proprietary interface that enables RF subsystems (RFSSs) built by different manufacturers to be connected together into wide area networks so that users on different networks can talk with each other. The wide area network connections using the ISSI provide an extended coverage area for subscriber units (SUs) that are roaming. The extended coverage area is important for public safety first responders that provide assistance in other jurisdictions during an emergency.   

The ISSI supports the messaging, and procedures necessary to enable RFSSs to track and locate SUs, set up and teardown calls and transfer voice information to the SUs. The ISSI uses SIP and RTP protocols (standardized protocols) to provide the messaging between RFSSs. 

The modern Land Mobile Radio (LMR) system includes many features in addition to voice communication.  Many features will not work across systems connected using the ISSI.  Whether a particular feature will work is determined by the systems and the particular ISSI implementation.

Overview of P25 ISSI Documentation Suite

The documentation suite which defines Scope One of the P25 ISSI consists of five standards. 

 ISSI Messages and Procedures for Voice Services
 ISSI Measurement Methods for Voice Services
 ISSI Performance Recommendations for Voice Services
 ISSI Conformance Testing for Voice Services
 ISSI Interoperability Testing for Voice Operations in Trunked Systems

A brief overview of each of these standards is provided in the subsections that follow.

ISSI Messages and Procedures for Voice Services

Scope One of the ISSI Messages and Procedures for Voice Services specifies the functional services of mobility management, call control and transmission control to provide trunked voice services for SU-to-SU and Group PTT calls involving multiple RFSSs. 

Mobility management uses the SIP protocol and describes the messages and procedures necessary for RFSSs to perform registration, and affiliation across the ISSI for roaming SUs. 

Call control also uses the SIP protocol and describes the messages and procedures necessary for RFSSs to set up and tear down a call, and manage RTP resources.  

Transmission control uses the RTP protocol and describes the messages and procedures necessary for RFSSs to convey voice information, and manage voice call requests. 

The functional service responsibilities of an RFSS in a call are dependent upon the type of call and also on the role of the RFSS in a call.   

The specifications developed in the ISSI Messages and Procedures for Voice Services standard provide the fundamental starting point for the remaining standards in the ISSI suite of standards.

ISSI Measurement Methods for Voice Services

The ISSI Measurement Methods for Voice Services is based on the functional services and protocols defined in the ISSI Messages and Procedures for Voice Services standard. 

Scope One of the ISSI Measurement Methods for Voice Services provides detailed measurement procedures to measure the ISSI Voice Service (IVS) Call Set-Up Delay (CSD) and IVS Message Transfer Delay (MTD) performance for SU-to-SU and Group calls.  

IVS-CSD and IVS-MTD performance parameters are used to evaluate the delay associated with successful packet transfers across RFSSs and across the IP backbone connections that link adjacent RFSSs.

ISSI Performance Recommendations for Voice Services

The ISSI Performance Recommendations for Voice Services is a companion standard to the ISSI Measurement Methods for Voice Services standard. Scope One of the ISSI Performance Recommendations for Voice Services provides agreed upon (by manufacturers and end users) average and maximum values for the IVS-CSD and IVS-MTD performance parameters described in the ISSI Measurement Methods for Voice Services standard.

ISSI Conformance Testing for Voice Services

The ISSI Conformance testing for Voice Services defines a set of procedures to test the conformance between two RF Sub-systems using an IP backbone network. The procedures define reference-signaling sequences for SU-to-SU and Group call scenarios.

ISSI Interoperability Testing for Voice Operations in Trunked Systems

The ISSI Interoperability testing for Voice Operations in Trunked Systems defines procedures to test the interoperability of SUs, and RFSSs from different manufacturers while performing trunked voice operations in configurations that use the ISSI.  

The trunked voice operations include registration of subscriber units, affiliation of subscriber units to the Subscriber Group Home, initiation of an SU-to-SU call, and initiation of a Group call.

See also
P25 Suite of Standards Overview

External links
 https://web.archive.org/web/20111106042758/http://www.tiaonline.org/standards/ Telecommunications Industry Association, Standards Development Overview
 https://web.archive.org/web/20120212013100/http://www.apcointl.org/frequency/project25/information.html APCO Project 25 Standards for Public Safety Digital Radio, Project 25 Homepage
 http://www.p25.com/images/pdf/CodanTG-001-4-0-0P25TrainingGuide.pdf Daniels' P25 Radio System Training Guide
 http://www-x.antd.nist.gov/proj25/ Department of Commerce ISSI Test and Evaluation Tools (DIETS) project at NIST.
 http://valid8.com/solutions/p25-issi-cssi-conformance P25 Compliance Test Tools for ISSI & CSSI

Networking hardware
Networking standards